Betelda is a rural locality (a selo) and the administrative center of Gerelsky Selsoviet, Tlyaratinsky District, Republic of Dagestan, Russia. The population was 485 as of 2010.

Geography 
Betelda is located 36 km southeast of Tlyarata (the district's administrative centre) by road. Gerel is the nearest rural locality.

References 

Rural localities in Tlyaratinsky District